Melanaema is a genus of moths in the family Erebidae erected by Arthur Gardiner Butler in 1877.

Species
Melanaema ni (Heylaerts, 1891)
Melanaema sanguinea Hampson, 1900
Melanaema venata Butler, 1877

References

Nudariina
Moth genera